In Brazil, the Council of the Republic is the superior agency of consultation and counseling of the Presidency of the Republic, created to advise the president in crisis moments. Among the competences of the Council of the Republic are deliberate about subjects such as federal intervention, state of defence and state of exception.

Operation
The creation of the Council of the Republic is provided by the 1988 Constitution, Article 89. However, the Council only started working in 1990, when then President Fernando Collor de Mello signed Law no. 8041/90, which puts in force this device of the Constitution.

According to the law, the President of the Republic is responsible to summon the Council in the case of federal intervention, state of defence and exception and also on relevant issues for the stability of the democratic institutions. As an advisory body, the President is not obligated to put in practice the measures from the council's advice.

Composition
The Council of the Republic is composed by 14 members, as provided in law:

Current members
 President of the Republic: Luiz Inácio Lula da Silva
 Vice President of the Republic: Geraldo Alckmin
 Minister of Justice and Public Security: Flávio Dino
 President of the Chamber of Deputies: Arthur Lira (PP-AL)
 President of the Federal Senate: Rodrigo Pacheco (PSD-MG)
 Chamber Majority Leader: Diego Andrade (PSD-MG)
 Chamber Minority Leader: Alencar Santana (PT-SP)
 Senate Majority Leader: Renan Calheiros (MDB-AL)
 Senate Minority Leader: Jean Paul Prates (PT-RN)
 Nominated by the President:
 Gonçalves Dias, Secretary of Institutional Security
 Paulo Skaf, former president of FIESP
 Nominated by the Chamber:
 Eugênio Aragão, former Minister of Justice
 José Carlos Aleluia, former federal deputy
 Nominated by the Senate:
 Davi Alcolumbre, Senator for Amapá
 Gilberto Kassab, former mayor of São Paulo

Council meetings
Besides the council exists since 1990, the first meeting of the Council of the Republic occurred  in February 2018, during the administration of president Michel Temer (MDB). The Council convened in a joint session with the National Defence Council for the a posteriori advice on the Rio de Janeiro public security federal intervention.

In two previous situations, however, the Council almost convened:

 The first was in 2005, when the Order of Attorneys of Brazil formally asked to the Presidency, then held by Luiz Inácio Lula da Silva (PT), to summon the Council to deal with the political crisis created by the Mensalão scandal. According to the entity, the crisis would threaten the country's democratic institutions, one of the situations foreseen for its summoning;
 The second was in 2010, when then Governor of the Federal District, José Roberto Arruda (PR), was arrested accused of obstructing the Federal Police investigations of the Mensalão scandal in the Federal District, which investigated corruption cases in the federal unit. Due to the political destabilization in the district, which had 5 different governors in the period of 12 months, the Prosecutor General of the Republic requested a federal intervention in the Federal District, other case forseen in the Council's attributions.

2021 meeting announcement
On 7 September 2021, during manifestations in his favor in Brasília, São Paulo and other capitals, president Jair Bolsonaro announced he would convene the Council on the following day, for the purpose of "show the people's picture in the acts".

Bolsonaro gave a speech in Brasília in the beginning of the afternoon and then headed to São Paulo, where he also gave a speech. The mention to the meeting of the Council of the Republic happened during the speech in the federal capital. Bolsonaro said he would invite the president of the Supreme Federal Court, Luiz Fux, besides the justice is not member of the Council.

In response, the Presidents of the Senate, Rodrigo Pacheco, and the Chamber of Deputies, Arthur Lira, reported they hadn't receive any formal invitation by the Presidency of the Republic. The President of the Supreme Court, Luiz Fux, said he would not be present, once he's not a member of the Council.

On the other hand, Vice President Hamilton Mourão said Bolsonaro was wrong when mentioning the meeting.

References

Executive branch of Brazil
Government agencies established in 1990
1990 establishments in Brazil